Made in NY is an incentive program and marketing campaign of the City of New York Mayor's Office of Film, Theatre & Broadcasting. Under the program, television and film productions which complete at least 75% of their shooting and rehearsal work in New York City are eligible for marketing incentives and tax credits, and can display the Made in NY logo in their closing credits. The logo was created in 2005 by graphic designer Rafael Esquer.

Made In NY also has a training program called the Made in NY Production Assistant Training Program.  This trains New York City residents as production assistants and a graduate of the training program is named PA of the Month by the Mayor's Office of Film.  The New York Daily News profiled James Adames, the June 2011 PA of the Month.  Adames started as a Production assistant and is now working as a TV/Film Producer & Location Manager.

Made in NY is also commissioning a gut renovation of two buildings in Bush Terminal, Brooklyn. The buildings are being designed by Brooklyn architecture firm, nARCHITECTS and are intended to become a garment production hub for New York City's garment industry formerly centered in Manhattan's garment district.

See also 
 Media of New York City
 Mayor's Office of Film, Theatre & Broadcasting
 NYC Media
 WNYE (FM)
 WNYE-TV

References

External links 
 Information at the Mayor's Office of Film, Theatre and Broadcasting website

New York
Economy of New York City
Film production
Mass media in New York City
Television organizations in the United States
Education in New York City